George Van Meter (August 23, 1932 – November 15, 2007) was an American cyclist. He competed in the individual and team road race events at the 1956 Summer Olympics.

References

External links
 

1932 births
2007 deaths
American male cyclists
Olympic cyclists of the United States
Cyclists at the 1956 Summer Olympics
Sportspeople from St. Louis